Eberhard Brecht (born 20 February 1950) is a German politician. Born in Quedlinburg, Saxony-Anhalt, he represents the SPD. Eberhard Brecht has served as a member of the Bundestag from the state of Saxony-Anhalt from 1990 till 2001 and since 2019.

Life 
He was a member of the Volkskammer 1990 and the Bundestag from 1990 to 2001 and since October 2019. From 2001 to 2015 he was Lord Mayor of Quedlinburg. He is a member of the Defence Committee.

References

External links 

 Bundestag biography 

1950 births
Living people
Members of the Bundestag for Saxony-Anhalt
Members of the Bundestag 2017–2021
Members of the Bundestag 1998–2002
Members of the Bundestag 1994–1998
Members of the Bundestag 1990–1994
Members of the Bundestag for the Social Democratic Party of Germany